Pickstock is an electoral constituency in the Belize District represented in the House of Representatives of the National Assembly of Belize since 2020 by Anthony Mahler of the People's United Party (PUP).

Profile

The Pickstock constituency was created for the 1961 general election as part of a major nationwide redistricting. The constituency is based in north-central Belize City, bordered by the Freetown, Fort George, Albert, Collet and Lake Independence constituencies.

Pickstock's best known area representative is former Prime Minister George Cadle Price, who represented the constituency during the latter part of his long political career. The seat had been held by the People's United Party from its creation until 2008, when it was won by the UDP's Elrington on his fourth attempt. The Belize Progressive Party contested the seat for the first time in 2015.

Area Representatives

Elections

References

Political divisions in Belize
Pickstock (Belize House constituency)
British Honduras Legislative Assembly constituencies established in 1961
1961 establishments in British Honduras